Tubungan, officially the Municipality of Tubungan,  is a 4th class municipality in the province of Iloilo, Philippines. According to the 2020 census, it has a population of 23,021 people.

Geography
With a land area of  found a hundred feet above sea level, the municipality's topography is dominated mostly by gentle rolling hills and idyllic mountains. The slope gradient ranges to as high as of 25 per cent in most areas giving it an almost mountainous terrain.

Barangays

Climate

Demographics

Economy

Social Welfare Services
Tubungan embarks on several social development programs to better the lives of its people. At present, there are 26 Day Care Service Programs that serve close to a thousand-day care pre-schoolers. To provide for the needs of malnourished young children ages 0–5 years old, the supplemental feeding program in 13 barangays at the moment is aiming to restore the health 391 toddlers suffering from 2nd degree of malnourishment.

Water Supply
Municipal water supplies are sourced from deep wells, jetmatic pump wells, rivers, and mountain springs. In some areas with insufficient water supply, several families share water from a communal deep well. However, despite its being land locked, residents of Tubungan still are adequately supplied with clean potable water for their household and agricultural needs.

In some barangays, a large percentage of their Internal Revenue Allotment (IRA), sometimes as high as 20 per cent, is allotted for the expansion of their water supply system. Nevertheless, these projects are limited only to residents living within the barangay centers.

With a daily combined water consumption of roughly 1.6 million liters, the municipality's existing water sources will be sufficient for the entire population ten years from the present. Moreover, the local government unit eyes to tap other potential water sources to provide more water as answer to the growing population demand and increasing economic growth.

Power
In year 2000, Iloilo Electric Company (ILECO) I reported that almost half of the total household in the municipality have electrical installations. This covers 27 barangays; in addition, 7 barangays already have electrical connections but still unenergized. The remaining of the residents makes use of kerosene, battery cells, and generators for their power sources. These, however, are located in far-flung barangays not yet reached by ILECO I.

Nonetheless, a plan to energize the entire municipality is already on its way since it is the priority program of the National Government as endorsed by the Local Government Unit of Tubungan.

Education
As of year 2000, a substantial number of Tubungan's young populations are enrolled in both primary and intermediate levels reaching to as high as 3000.

The municipality has 12 complete elementary schools and a national high school. Tubungan National High School not only accommodates students from Tubungan itself but also to the secondary school students coming from the nearby towns of Igbaras, Tigbauan, and Leon.
Pre-elementary education is offered by almost all of the public elementary schools including two existing private kindergarten schools.

Tubungan requires additional class rooms and personnel to provide for the needs of its ever-increasing student population. In addition to this, a proposal for the institution of another secondary school to be located in Barangay Lanag Norte is already underway to serve the students living in far-flung barangays.

References

External links 
 [ Philippine Standard Geographic Code]
 Philippine Census Information
 Local Governance Performance Management System

Municipalities of Iloilo